Ixodes cookei is a species of tick in the genus Ixodes. It is normally a parasite of carnivorans, such as raccoons, foxes, and weasels, but has also been recorded on the groundhog (Marmota monax) and the marsh rice rat (Oryzomys palustris). In the northeastern United States, it is a vector of Powassan virus.

See also
List of parasites of the marsh rice rat

References

Literature cited
 
 

cookei
Arachnids of North America
Animals described in 1869